Validar (also Romanized as Valīdar; also known as Valehgareh, Val’gar, and Walgāra) is a village in Chavarzaq Rural District, Chavarzaq District, Tarom County, Zanjan Province, Iran. At the 2006 census, its population was 692, in 143 families.

References 

Populated places in Tarom County